The men's decathlon competition at the 2003 Summer Universiade took place on 28 August and 29 August 2003 in the Daegu World Cup Stadium in Daegu, South Korea.

Medalists

Records

Results

See also
2003 Decathlon Year Ranking
2003 World Championships in Athletics – Men's decathlon
2003 Hypo-Meeting

References
 decathlon2000
 results
 Results

Decathlon
2003